Johann Christoph Brotze (1 September 1742 – 4 August 1823) was a German pedagogue, artist and ethnographer.

Biography
Brotze was born in Görlitz, Electorate of Saxony. He studied theology and philosophy at the universities of Leipzig and Wittenberg, and was also skilled at technical drawing. He went to Riga in Livonia in 1768 and spent the next 46 years as a teacher at the Riga Imperial Lyceum.

During that period he collected historical data and depicted in drawings and paintings everything he saw around him in his everyday life, as well as most buildings and monuments of significance in Livonia, supplemented with extensive descriptions. Today his works are considered an extremely valuable source of information for historians.

Works
Zeichnungen und deren Beschreibungen

Books 

 Sammlung verschiedener Liefländischer Monumente, Prospecte, Münzen, Wappen, etc.

Gallery

See also
Ethnography
Baltic Germans

References

External links

Digital collection of Johann Christoph Brotze drawings at the Latvian Academic Library

1742 births
1823 deaths
German draughtsmen
18th-century German educators
German ethnographers
German emigrants to the Russian Empire
People from Görlitz
People from the Electorate of Saxony
Artists from Riga
People from Livonia
Leipzig University alumni
University of Wittenberg alumni
German male non-fiction writers